Nicole Billa (born 5 March 1996) is an Austrian footballer who plays as a striker for TSG 1899 Hoffenheim. She won the Women's Footballer of the Year award in Germany in 2021.

Career statistics
Scores and results list Austria's goal tally first, score column indicates score after each Billa goal.

Honours 
FSK St. Pölten-Spratzern
 ÖFB-Frauenliga: 2014–15
 ÖFB Ladies Cup: 2013–14, 2014–15

References

External links 
 

1996 births
Living people
Austrian women's footballers
Women's association football forwards
Austria women's international footballers
UEFA Women's Euro 2022 players
ÖFB-Frauenliga players
Frauen-Bundesliga players
FSK St. Pölten-Spratzern players
TSG 1899 Hoffenheim (women) players
Austrian expatriate sportspeople in Germany
Expatriate women's footballers in Germany
UEFA Women's Euro 2017 players
Austrian expatriate women's footballers
People from Kufstein
Footballers from Tyrol (state)